Polystichum drepanum, also known as Madeira shield-fern, is a species of fern in the Dryopteridaceae family.
 
It is native to Madeira. Its natural habitat is subtropical moist lowland forests. It is threatened by habitat loss.

Taxonomy
It was first described by Olof Swartz as Aspidium drepanum in 1801, and moved to the genus Polystichum by Carl Borivoj Presl in 1836.

References

drepanum
Flora of Madeira
Critically endangered plants
Plants described in 1801